The following is a list of inscribed artifacts, items made or given shape by humans, that are significant to biblical archaeology.

Selected artifacts significant to biblical chronology
These table lists inscriptions which are of particular significance to the study of biblical chronology. The table lists the following information about each artifact:
Name In English
Current location Museum or site
Discovered Date and location of discovery
Date Proposed date of creation of artifact
Writing Script used in inscription (if any)
Significance Reason for significance to biblical archeology
Refs ANET and COS references, and link to editio princeps (EP), if known

Egyptian

Other significant Egyptian artifacts
 Execration texts – earliest references to many Biblical locations
 Papyrus Brooklyn 35.1446– A document that lists the names of 45 individuals, including a Canaanite woman named "Šp-ra." Scholars assume that this is a hieroglyphic transliteration of the Hebrew name "Shiphrah," which also appears in Exodus 1:15–21. However, the document dates to c. 1833-1743 BCE (centuries before the biblical Shiphra would have lived).
 Ipuwer Papyrus – poem describing Egypt as afflicted by natural disasters and in a state of chaos. The document is dated to around 1250 BC but the content is thought to be earlier, dated back to the Middle Kingdom, though no earlier than the late Twelfth Dynasty. Once thought to describe the biblical Exodus, it is now considered the world's earliest known treatise on political ethics, suggesting that a good king is one who controls unjust officials, thus carrying out the will of the gods.
 Berlin pedestal relief – considered by many modern scholars to contain the earliest historic reference to ancient Israel. Experts remain divided on this hypothesis.

Cuneiform

Other significant Cuneiform artifacts
 Creation myths and flood myths – recorded on the Epic of Gilgamesh, the Atra-Hasis tablets, the Enûma Eliš, the Eridu Genesis and the Barton Cylinder
 Law tablets – ancient Near East legal tablets: Code of Hammurabi, Laws of Eshnunna, the Code of Ur-Nammu, king of Ur (c. 2050 BC), the Laws of Eshnunna (c. 1930 BC) and the codex of Lipit-Ishtar of Isin (c. 1870 BC). Later codes than Hammurabi's include the Code of the Nesilim. Hittite laws, the Assyrian laws, and Mosaic Law / Ten Commandments. (see Cuneiform law).
Tell al-Rimah stela (c. 780 BC) – tells of the exploits of Adad-nirari III, mentioning "Joash King of Samaria"
Annals of Tiglath-Pileser III (740–730 BC):
Layard 45b+ III R 9,1 possibly refers to [KUR sa-me-ri-i-na-a-a] as ["land of Samaria"]
The Iran Stela refers to KUR sa-m[e]-ri-i-na-a-[a] "land of Samaria"
Layard 50a + 50b + 67a refers to URU sa-me-ri-na-a-a "city of Samaria"
Layard 66 refers to URU Sa-me-ri-na "city of Samaria"
 III R 9.3 50, refers to "Menahem the Samarian"
 Nimrud Tablet III R 10.2 28–29, refers to the overthrown of Pekah by Hoshea.
 one fragment refers to "Azriau" and another it has been joined to refers to "Yaudi". Some scholars have interpreted this as Ahaziah / Uzziah, although this is disputed and has not gained scholarly consensus.
 III R 10,2 refers to KUR E Hu-um-ri-a "land of Bit-Humri"
 ND 4301 + 4305 refers to KUR E Hu-um-ri-a "land of Bit-Humri"
 Babylonian Chronicle ABC1 (725 BC) – Shalmaneser V refers to URU Sa-ma/ba-ra-'-in "city of Samar(i)a"
Annals of Sargon II (720 BC):
Nimrud Prism, Great Summary Inscription refers to URU Sa-me-ri-na "city of Samerina"
Palace Door, Small Summary Inscription, Cylinder Inscription, Bull Inscription refers to KUR Bit-Hu-um-ri-a "land of Bit-Humri"
Victory stele of Esarhaddon – a dolerite stele commemorating the return of Esarhaddon after his army's second battle and victory over Pharaoh Taharqa in northern ancient Egypt in 671 BC, discovered in 1888 in Zincirli Höyük (Sam'al, or Yadiya) by Felix von Luschan and Robert Koldewey. It is now in the Pergamon Museum in Berlin.
 Esarhaddon's Succession Treaty (written around 675 BCE) – Some scholars think that this treaty served as a literary model for the curses in Deuteronomy 28:15–64, as well as content in Deuteronomy 13, due to strong textual similarities.
Nebo-Sarsekim Tablet (circa 595 BC) – a clay cuneiform inscription referring to an official at the court of Nebuchadrezzar II, king of Babylon, possibly the same official named in the Biblical Jeremiah.
Jehoiachin's Rations Tablets (6th century BC) – Describe the rations set aside for a royal captive identified with Jehoiachin, king of Judah (Cf. 2 Kings ,; ; 2 Chronicles ; Jeremiah ; 29:2; ; Ezekiel ).

Canaanite and Aramaic

Other significant Canaanite and Aramaic artifacts 

Early Paleo-Hebrew writing – contenders for the earliest Hebrew inscriptions include the Gezer calendar, Biblical period ostraca at Elah and Izbet Sartah, and the Zayit Stone
Pim weight – evidence of the use of an ancient source for the Book of Samuel due to the use of an archaic term.
Khirbet Qeiyafa ostracon – 10th century BC inscription – both the language it is written in and the translation are disputed. Was discovered in excavations near Israel's Elah valley.
Tell es-Safi inscription (10th to mid 9th centuries BC) – Potsherd inscribed with the two names "alwt" and "wlt", etymologically related to the name Goliath and demonstrate that the name fits with the context of late-tenth/early-ninth-century BC Philistine culture. Found at Tell es-Safi, the traditional identification of Gath.
Ophel pithos is a 3,000-year-old inscribed fragment of a ceramic jar found near Jerusalem's Temple Mount by archeologist Eilat Mazar. It is the earliest alphabetical inscription found in Jerusalem written in what was probably Proto-Canaanite script. Some scholars believe it to be an inscription of the type of wine that was held in a jar.
Amman Citadel Inscription – 9th century BC inscription in the Ammonite language, one of the few surviving written records of Ammon.
Melqart stele – (9th–8th century BC) William F. Albright identifies Bar-hadad with Ben-hadad I, who was a contemporary of the biblical Asa and Baasha.
Ostraca House – (probably about 850 BC, at least prior to 750 BC) 64 legible ostraca found in the treasury of Ahab – written in early Hebrew.
Deir Alla Inscription (c. 840–760 BC) 9th or 8th century BC inscription about a prophet named Balaam (cf. the Book of Numbers).
Kuntillet Ajrud inscriptions – (9th–8th century BC) inscriptions in Phoenician script including references to Yahweh
Sefire steles (8th century BC) – described as "the best extrabiblical source for West Semitic traditions of covenantal blessings and curses".
Stele of Zakkur (8th century BC) – Mentions Hazael king of Aram.
Shebna Inscription (8th–7th century BC?) – found over the lintel or doorway of a tomb, has been ascribed to Hezekiah's comptroller Shebna.
King Ahaz's Seal (732 to 716 BC) – Ahaz was a king of Judah but "did not do what was right in the sight of the Lord his God, as his ancestor David had done". He worshiped idols and followed pagan practices. "He even made his son pass through fire, according to the abominable practices of the nations". Ahaz was the son and successor of Jotham.
Bullae (c. 715–687 BC or 716–687 BC) (clay roundels impressed with a personal seal identifying the owner of an object, the author of a document, etc.) are, like ostraka, relatively common, both in digs and on the antiquities market. The identification of individuals named in bullae with equivalent names from the Bible is difficult, but identifications have been made with king Hezekiah and his servants (????? avadim in Hebrew, [עבדים - slaves])
Bulla of Gemariah son of Shaphan (r. 609–598 BC) – possible link to a figure during the reign of Jehoiakim (Jeremiah 36:10). Archaeologist Yair Shoham notes: "It should be borne in mind, however, that the names found on the bullae were popular in ancient times and it is equally possible that there is no connection between the names found on the bullae and the person mentioned in the Bible."
Seal of Jehucal (7th century BC) – Jehucal or Jucal is mentioned in chapters 37 and 38 of the Book of Jeremiah where King Zedekiah sends Jehucal son of Shelemiah and the priest Zephaniah son of Maaseiah to the prophet Jeremiah saying "Please pray for us to the Lord our God" (Jeremiah 37:3). His seal and also one of Gedaliah, son of Pashhur (also mentioned in Jeremiah 38:1 together with Jehucal) were found within a few yards from each other during excavations in the city of David, Jerusalem, in 2005 and 2008, respectively, by Eilat Mazar.
Khirbet Beit Lei graffiti contains oldest known Hebrew writing of the word "Jerusalem", dated to 7th century BC  "I am YHWH thy Lord. I will accept the cities of Judah and I will redeem Jerusalem" "Absolve us oh merciful God. Absolve us oh YHWH"
Yavne-Yam ostracon is an inscribed pottery fragment dated to 7th century BC and written in ancient Hebrew language. It contains earliest extra-biblical reference to the observance of Shabbat.

Ketef Hinnom scrolls – Probably the oldest surviving texts currently known from the Hebrew Bible – priestly blessing dated to 600 BC. Text from the Book of Numbers in the Old Testament. Described as "one of most significant discoveries ever made" for biblical studies.
Lachish letters – letters written in carbon ink by Hoshaiah (cf. Nehemiah , Jeremiah), a military officer stationed near Jerusalem, to Joash the commanding officer at Lachish during the last years of Jeremiah during Zedekiah's reign (c.588 BC) (see Jeremiah 34:7). Lachish fell soon after, two years before the fall of Jerusalem.
Arad ostraca: the House of Yahweh ostracon is an ancient pottery fragment discovered at Tel Arad probably referring to the Temple at Jerusalem.
Elephantine papyri, ancient Jewish papyri dating to the 5th century BC, name three persons mentioned in Nehemiah: Darius II, Sanballat the Horonite and Johanan the high priest.
Hasmonean coinage (164 BC – 35 BC)

Greek and Latin

Other significant Greek and Latin artifacts 
Pilate Stone (c. 36 AD) – carved inscription attributed to Pontius Pilate, a prefect of the Roman-controlled province of Judaea from 26 to 36 AD.
Delphi Inscription (c. 52 AD) – The reference to proconsul Gallio in the inscription provides an important marker for developing a chronology of the life of Apostle Paul by relating it to the trial of Paul in Achaea mentioned in the Acts of the Apostles (18:12–17).
Erastus Inscription (Roman period) – an inscription found in 1929 near a paved area northeast of the theater of Corinth, dated to the mid-first century and reads "Erastus in return for his aedileship paved it at his own expense." Some New Testament scholars have identified this aedile Erastus with the Erastus mentioned in the Epistle to the Romans but this is disputed by others.
Judaea Capta coinage (after 70 AD) – a series of commemorative coins originally issued by the Roman Emperor Vespasian to celebrate the capture of Judaea and the destruction of the Jewish Second Temple by his son Titus in 70 AD during the First Jewish Revolt.
Nazareth Inscription bears an edict of Caesar prohibiting grave robbing.

Controversial (forgery, claimed forgery, or identification disputed)
Borsippa – identified as the Tower of Babel in Talmudic and Arabic culture, but not accepted by modern scholarship.
Ebla tablets – once thought to have made references to, and thus confirmed, the existence of Abraham, David, Sodom and Gomorrah among other Biblical references.
Foundation Stone – stone also called the Well of Souls, now located in the Dome of the Rock. According to the Bible, King David purchased a threshing floor owned by Araunah the Jebusite, and some believe that it was upon this rock that he offered the sacrifice mentioned in the verse. David wanted to construct a Temple in Jerusalem, but as his hands were "bloodied", he was forbidden to do so himself. The task was left to his son Solomon, who completed the Temple in c. 950 BC.
Uzziah Tablet (8th century BC or 30–70 AD?) – controversial tablet discovered in 1931 by Professor E. L. Sukenik of the Hebrew University of Jerusalem in a Russian convent.
Jehoash Inscription – controversial black stone tablet in Phoenician regarding King Jehoash's repair work. Suspected to be a forgery (but see: Book of Kings).
Warren's Shaft – possible route corresponding to the biblical account of Joab, king David's commander, launching a secretive attack against the Jebusites, who controlled Jerusalem.
Ivory pomegranate – a thumb-sized semitic ornamental artifact bears an inscription: "Holy (sacred) to the Priest of the House of God (YHWH)", thought to have adorned the High Priest's sceptre within the Holy of Holies.
Tower of Siloam – ruins possibly mentioned in the Gospel of Luke.
James Ossuary – a 1st-century limestone box that was used for containing the bones of the dead, bearing an Aramaic inscription in the Hebrew alphabet, "James, son of Joseph, brother of Jesus", cut into one side of the box.
Talpiot Tomb – Joshua son of Joseph tomb; its identification with Jesus is highly controversial.
Caiaphas ossuary – a highly decorated ossuary twice inscribed "Joseph, son of Caiaphas" which held the bones of a 60-year-old male, discovered in a burial cave in south Jerusalem in November 1990.
Sudarium of Oviedo – a bloodstained piece of sweat cloth (Latin: Sudarium) thought to be the cloth that was wrapped around the head of Jesus Christ after he died as described in John 20:6–7. Now it is kept in the Cámara Santa of the Cathedral of San Salvador, Oviedo, Spain.
Titulus Crucis – a piece of wood claimed to be a relic of the True Cross, which Christian tradition holds to be a part of the cross's titulus (inscription). Now it is kept in the church of Santa Croce in Gerusalemme in Rome.
Acheiropoieta (see Shroud of Turin, Image of Edessa, and the Veil of Veronica).
Relics attributed to Jesus, including those identified by Constantine's mother Helena and Macarius of Jerusalem, such as the Holy Nails, Holy Tunic and the True Cross.
 Shapira Scroll, leather strips containing a somewhat different text of the  Ten Commandments, belonging to Moses Wilhelm Shapira, a Jerusalem antiquities dealer. Widely discredited following its 1883 release, resulting in Shapira's suicide. Has been reassessed following the 1946 discovery of the Dead Sea Scrolls.
Shapira collection – other biblical artifacts in the possession and allegedly forged by Moses Shapira. The discovery of the Dead Sea scrolls in 1947, in approximately the same area he claimed his material was discovered, has cast some doubt on the original forgery charges.
Stone Seal of Manasseh – Stone seal of Manasseh, King of Judah c.687–642 BC. Reportedly offered to a private collector for one million dollars.
Miriam ossuary, found in 2011 in the Valley of Elah and mentions the High Priest Caiaphas who was responsible for the conviction of Jesus for blasphemy

Significant museums
Israel Museum, Jerusalem
Bible Lands Museum, Jerusalem
Hecht Museum
Oriental Institute, Chicago
British Museum
The Louvre

External lists
 ANET:  Ancient Near Eastern Texts Relating to the Old Testament.  Third Edition with Supplement.  Ed. James B. Pritchard. Princeton:  Princeton Univ. Press, 1969
 COS:  The Context of Scripture.  3 volumes.  Eds. William W. Hallo and K. Lawson Younger. Leiden:  Brill, 1997-2002
 RANE: 
 Indices to ANET and COS:  and 
 Dr. Ralph W. Klein's tables of artifacts - 10 pages of tables sorted by era
 Extra-biblical sources for Hebrew and Jewish history (1913)
 http://www.egyptologyforum.org/EEFtexts.html
 Bible History Daily The Biblical Archaeology Society website, publishers of Biblical Archaeology Review

See also
 Archaeology of Israel
 Assyrian Siege of Jerusalem
 Assyro-Babylonian religion
 The Bible and history
 Biblical archaeology (excavations and artifacts)
 Chronology of the Bible
 Cities of the Ancient Near East
 Hittite sites – Hittites – History of the Hittites
 Levantine archaeology
 Library of Ashurbanipal
 List of biblical figures identified in extra-biblical sources
 List of burial places of Biblical figures
 List of Egyptian papyri by date
 List of proposed Assyrian references to Kingdom of Israel (Samaria)
 List of megalithic sites
 Model of Jerusalem in the Late 2nd Temple Period
 Near Eastern archaeology
 Nag Hammadi library – early Christian gnostic papyri.
 Non-canonical books referenced in the Bible
 Oxyrhynchus Papyri – collection of Old and New Testament papyri, Apocryphal works and works of Philo

References

Sources

 
 
 
 

Archaeology-related lists
Bible-related lists
Archaeological artifacts
Biblical archaeology
Inscriptions